The 1968–69 South Carolina Gamecocks men's basketball team represented the University of South Carolina during the 1968–69 men's college basketball . South Carolina finished 2nd in the ACC at 11-3 with a win over #2 ranked North Carolina. South Carolina finished the season ranked 13th in the AP poll.

Roster

Schedule

Rankings

References

South Carolina Gamecocks men's basketball seasons
South Carolina
South Carolina
South Carol
South Carol